Eleven (also known as Ele∀en) is a music album by the Finnish band 22-Pistepirkko. It was released in 1998.

Track listing
 "Taxi 74"
 "Onion Soup"
 "Coma Moon"
 "Sad Lake City"
 "Boardroom Walk"
 "Hey Man"
 "Let the Romeo Weep"
 "Beautiful Morning"
 "Frustration"
 "Shadow"

Music videos were made for "Onion Soup" and "Boardroom Walk".

References

22-Pistepirkko albums
1998 albums